Kelsey Egwu (born February 1, 2004) is a Canadian soccer player who plays for FC London in League1 Ontario.

Early life 
Egwu is of Nigerian descent and was born in Toronto in Canada, before moving to Nigeria. In 2015, he moved back to Canada, this time in Edmonton. Egwu played youth soccer with St. Albert Impact FC, Edmonton Strikers and BTB Academy. In 2021, he had a training stint with Pacific FC of the Canadian Premier League. He played for Team Alberta at the 2022 Canada Summer Games.

University career
In 2022, he began attending MacEwan University, where he played for the men's soccer team.

Club career
On April 30, 2022, Egwu signed a U18 developmental contract with FC Edmonton of the Canadian Premier League. He made his debut on May 14, playing the full 90 against Pacific FC.

In February 2023, he joined FC London in League1 Ontario.

References

External links

2004 births
Living people
Association football defenders
Canadian people of Nigerian descent
Canadian soccer players
Canadian Premier League players
FC Edmonton players